Susan A. Bonilla (née Woodward; born June 22, 1960) is an American politician who served in the California State Assembly, representing the 14th district, encompassing parts of Contra Costa and Solano counties. She is a Democrat. Prior to being elected to the state Assembly, she was a member of the Contra Costa County Board of Supervisors and was Mayor of Concord before that.

Due partly to term limits, Bonilla had originally planned to run for Mark DeSaulnier's State Senate seat in 2016, however in November 2014 DeSaulnier resigned to take office in the U.S. House of Representatives. Bonilla ran in a 2015 special election to fill DeSaulnier's seat in California's 7th State Senate district, but lost to Orinda Mayor Steve Glazer in an upset.

In 2017, Bonilla became the California State Director of the Council for a Strong America.

2014 California State Assembly

References

External links 
 
 Campaign website

Azusa Pacific University alumni
California city council members
County supervisors in California
Educators from California
American women educators
Living people
Mayors of places in California
Democratic Party members of the California State Assembly
Women state legislators in California
1960 births
San Francisco Bay Area politicians
Mexican-American people in California politics
Hispanic and Latino American mayors in California
Hispanic and Latino American women in politics
Women city councillors in California
People from Concord, California
21st-century American politicians
21st-century American women politicians
Women mayors of places in California
Hispanic and Latino American state legislators in California